Grevesmühlen-Land is an Amt in the district of Nordwestmecklenburg, in Mecklenburg-Vorpommern, Germany. The seat of the Amt is in Grevesmühlen, itself not part of the Amt.

The Amt Grevesmühlen-Land consists of the following municipalities:
Bernstorf 
Gägelow
Roggenstorf 
Rüting 
Stepenitztal
Testorf-Steinfort 
Upahl 
Warnow

Ämter in Mecklenburg-Western Pomerania